Eric Block (born January 25, 1942) is an American chemist whose research has focused on the chemistry of organosulfur and organoselenium compounds, Allium chemistry (the chemistry of garlic, onion, and other alliums), and the chemistry of olfaction. As of 2018, he is Distinguished Professor of Chemistry Emeritus at the University at Albany, SUNY.

Biography

Eric Block was born in New York City in 1942.  He received his B.S. (1962) degree from Queens College of the City University of New York, where he was elected to Phi Beta Kappa. After a research assistant position at Brookhaven National Laboratories he attended Harvard University, where he received his M.S. (1964), and Ph.D. (1967) degrees as both a National Science Foundation and National Institutes of Health Predoctoral Fellow, working with E. J. Corey as a graduate student in the area of organic synthesis using organosulfur compounds. After a postdoctoral fellowship at Harvard with E. J. Corey, Block joined the faculty at the University of Missouri–St. Louis in 1967, becoming Professor in 1979. In 1981, he moved to the University at Albany, SUNY, where he was Chair of Chemistry from 1985–1991. He was named Distinguished Professor in 2002 and Carla Rizzo Delray Professor in 2006. In 2018 he became Emeritus Professor at Albany and Visiting Professor in the Chemistry Department at University of California, Irvine.

Block has also held visiting positions at the Harvard University (1974), University of Bologna (1984), Weizmann Institute (2000), Wolfson College, University of Cambridge (2006), Chinese Academy of Sciences (2013), and University of California, Los Angeles (2018).

Research areas

Block is known for his research on organosulfur and organoselenium chemistry, particularly that of genus Allium plants, such as garlic and onion. This work is summarized in two monographs, two review articles, and is the subject of a 2014 American Chemical Society Webinar. Block's monograph on alliums has been published in a Chinese edition. Since 2005, another major area of collaborative research with neurobiology and computational chemistry colleagues has been the study of the molecular basis for olfaction, particularly the role of metals such as copper in olfaction and molecular mechanisms for sensing thiols as well as musk, such as muscone. With his collaborators Block has also examined the plausibility of the controversial vibration theory of olfaction, reaching the conclusion that it is implausible.

Service
Since 1994, Block has been an editorial board member of the Journal of Agricultural and Food Chemistry. Block also served as associate editor (1984–1988) and editorial board member (1984–2000), for Phosphorus, Sulfur, Silicon and the Related Elements, as editorial board member and founding member of Heteroatom Chemistry, 1990–1995, and as associate editor for Organic Reactions, Volume 30. Block was a founding member and international advisory board member of the International Conference on Heteroatom Chemistry (ICHAC) series of meetings, and Chair of ICHAC-2, held in Albany, NY in 1989. He was also Chair of the Symposium on New Organosulfur Chemistry, Pacifichem 2015 in Honolulu, HI.

Honors and awards

 Guggenheim Fellowship (1984–1985)
 ACS Award for the Advancement of Application of Agricultural and Food Chemistry, American Chemical Society (1987)
 Fellow Award:  Agricultural and Food Chemistry Division, American Chemical Society (1993)
 International Council on Main Group Chemistry Award for Excellence in Main Group Chemistry Research (1994)
 Kenneth A. Spencer Award, Kansas City Section American Chemical Society (2003)
 Sterling B. Hendricks Memorial Lectureship Award (Agricultural Research Service of the United States Department of Agriculture) (2012)
 Fellow, American Association for the Advancement of Science (2012)
 Fellow, American Chemical Society (2014)
 Ernest Guenther Award for the Chemistry of Natural Products of the American Chemical Society (2016)
 Christopher S. Foote Lecturer, Chemistry Department, University of California, Los Angeles (2018)

Selected publications 
Block has published five books and 257 articles; his books and several of his most cited and recent papers are listed below.
Books

Reviews

Research papers

References

External links
Eric Block's website

1942 births
Living people
Queens College, City University of New York alumni
Harvard University alumni
University of Missouri–St. Louis faculty
University at Albany, SUNY faculty
21st-century American chemists